David Ross Sweeney (25 May 1960 – 16 September 2021) was a Canadian sailor. He competed at the 1984 Summer Olympics, the 1988 Summer Olympics, and the 1992 Summer Olympics.

References

External links
 

1960 births
2021 deaths
Canadian male sailors (sport)
Olympic sailors of Canada
Sailors at the 1984 Summer Olympics – Tornado
Sailors at the 1988 Summer Olympics – Tornado
Sailors at the 1992 Summer Olympics – Tornado
Sportspeople from Boston
American emigrants to Canada